Olga Pierri (3 June 1914 – 28 September 2016) was an Uruguayan guitarist and teacher.

Biography
From a young age, Olga Pierri had an interest in music, as her father, was himself a noted guitarist. Mr. Pierri gave Olga her first lessons in not just his own methods, but those of Pascual Roch.

In 1948, Pierri formed an all female group of four to five members that could throughout its run count among its members Pierri herself, Teté Richi, Margot Prieto, and Margarita Quadros. The group's music, written by Pierri, inspired by Uruguayan and Latin American culture at large managed to become popular through Uruguay.

On 3 June 2016, Pierri celebrated her 102nd birthday by performing on public radio alone and with an ensemble of her best students, called "Conjunto Femenina de Guitarras."

Citations

1914 births
2016 deaths
People from Montevideo
Uruguayan guitarists
Uruguayan women educators
Uruguayan centenarians
Women centenarians